Khoton Lake (Mongolian: Хотон нуур) is a freshwater lake in Altai Tavan Bogd National Park in Bayan-Ölgii Province, western Mongolia.

Geography
It is fed by the Khuiten River from the east and other rivers from the north. The lake is home to abundant fish life.

References

Lakes of Mongolia